Barbara Ferries (born September 5, 1944) is an American skier. She competed in Alpine skiing at the 1964 Winter Olympics.

References

External links
 

1944 births
Living people
Alpine skiers at the 1964 Winter Olympics
American female alpine skiers
Olympic alpine skiers of the United States
Place of birth missing (living people)
21st-century American women